James Ferguson Conant (born June 10, 1958) is an American philosopher at the University of Chicago who has written extensively on topics in philosophy of language, ethics, and metaphilosophy. He is perhaps best known for his writings on Wittgenstein, and his association with the New Wittgenstein school of Wittgenstein interpretation initiated by Cora Diamond.

Life and career
Conant was born in Kyoto, Japan to American parents. He is the grandson of former Harvard University president James Bryant Conant. At 14, he attended Phillips Exeter Academy.  He received his A.B. in Philosophy and History of Science from Harvard College in 1982, and his Ph.D. in Philosophy from Harvard University in 1990. He joined the philosophy faculty at the University of Pittsburgh from 1990-1999, and then became Professor of Philosophy at the University of Chicago. In December, 2012, he became co-director of the Center for Analytic German Idealism at Leipzig University, and in July, 2017 he was appointed Humboldt Professor of Philosophy at Leipzig University.  He remains as an adjunct professor at Leipzig.

Philosophical work
Since the mid 1990s Conant, together with Cora Diamond has advanced a “resolute reading” of Wittgenstein's early work which seeks to expose neglected underlying continuities between the philosopher's early and later approaches to philosophy, especially between his early Tractatus Logico-Philosophicus and his later Philosophical Investigations.  Conant has contributed to other areas in the history of analytic philosophy, writing particularly about the work of Gottlob Frege, of Rudolf Carnap, as well as about the relation between the views of both of these figures and those of Wittgenstein. A related theme running throughout Conant's work is the relation between the ideas of Immanuel Kant, and the Kantian tradition more broadly, and the analytic tradition.

A recurring topic throughout Conant’s work is also that of philosophical skepticism. In this connection, he has drawn a distinction between two varieties of skepticism, which he calls “Cartesian skepticism” and “Kantian skepticism” respectively.

In 2020, Harvard University Press published the 1100-page volume The Logical Alien: Conant and His Critics, edited by Sofia Miguens. The volume gathers Conant’s 1991 article The Search for Logically Alien Thought with reflections on it by eight philosophers: Jocelyn Benoist, Matthew Boyle, Martin Gustafsson, Arata Hamawaki, Adrian Moore, Barry Stroud, Peter Sullivan, and Charles Travis — followed by Conant’s responses to them.

Awards
In 2016, Conant was one of three academics from abroad selected to receive Germany’s top international research award, the Alexander von Humboldt Professorship Research Prize.

In 2012 James Conant received the Humboldt Foundation Anneliese Maier Research Award, a five-year award to promote the internationalisation of the humanities and social sciences in Germany.
In summer 2011, the Institute of Philosophy of the University of Porto in Portugal hosted a conference titled The Logical Alien at 20, dedicated to the 20th anniversary of the publication of James Conant's paper "The Search for Logically Alien Thought".

Bibliography
 Hilary Putnam: Realism with a Human Face (editor), Harvard University Press, Cambridge, MA, 1990
 "The Search for Logically Alien Thought: Descartes, Kant, Frege and the Tractatus" in The Philosophy of Hilary Putnam, Philosophical Topics, Vol. 20, No. 1 (1991), pp. 115–180.
 Hilary Putnam: Words and Life (editor), Harvard University Press, Cambridge, MA, 1994 
 Thomas Kuhn: The Road Since Structure (co-editor with John Haugeland), University of Chicago Press, Chicago, IL, 2000
 Pragmatism and Realism (co-editor), Routledge, London, 2002
 "The Method of the Tractatus", in From Frege to Wittgenstein: Perspectives on Early Analytic Philosophy, edited by Erich H. Reck, Oxford University Press, 2002
 Rileggere Wittgenstein (co-author with Cora Diamond), with a Foreword by Piergiorgio Donatelli and an Afterword by Silver Bronzo, Carocci, Rome, 2010 
 Orwell ou le Pouvoir de la Verite (Agone, 2011) 
Friedrich Nietzsche: Perfektionismus & Perspektivismus tr. by Joachim Schulte, Konstanz University Press, 2014.
 Varieties of Skepticism: Essays after Kant, Wittgenstein, and Cavell (co-edited with Andrea Kern), Walter de Gruyter, Berlin 2014.
The Norton Anthology of Western Philosophy: After Kant, WW Norton & Co, 2017
The Logical Alien: Conant and his Critics, Harvard University Press, 2020

See also
 American philosophy
 List of American philosophers

References

External links
 James Conant's Curriculum Vitae
 James Conant's webpage at The University of Chicago Department of Philosophy website
Forschungskolleg Analytic German Idealism (FAGI)
James Conant's webpage at the Forschungskolleg Analytic German Idealism.
Chicago Center for German Philosophy (CCGP)

Wittgensteinian philosophers
Philosophers of language
1958 births
Living people
Phillips Exeter Academy alumni
Harvard College alumni
University of Chicago faculty
20th-century American philosophers
21st-century American philosophers